Peter Flanagan (c. 1886–c. 1952) was a rugby union player who represented Australia.

Flanagan, a flanker}, was born in Dublin and claimed a total of 2 international rugby caps for Australia.

References

                   

Australian rugby union players
Australia international rugby union players
Rugby union flankers
1880s births
Year of birth uncertain
1950s deaths
Year of death uncertain